Sweetwater is a city in Monroe and McMinn counties in the U.S. state of Tennessee, and the most populous city in Monroe County. The population was 5764 at the 2010 census and 6,312 at the 2020 census. Sweetwater is the home of the Craighead Caverns which contains the Lost Sea, the United States' largest underground lake.  In 2022, TravelMag named Sweetwater one of Tennessee’s Ten Most Charming Cities.

History
A legend states that the town's name originated from settlers’ descriptions of area springs.

Sweetwater was established in the 1850s on a series of lots sold by Isaac Lenoir (1807–1875), a local politician and son of the founder of Lenoir City (located a few miles to the northeast in Loudon County).  Sweetwater was officially incorporated in 1875.

Geography

Sweetwater is located at  (35.602604, -84.466992).  The city lies along Sweetwater Creek, which flows northeast for several miles before emptying into the Watts Bar Lake impoundment of the Tennessee River.  The creek's drainage has created a lowland area known as Sweetwater Valley, which is surrounded by low hills.

Sweetwater is centered along U.S. Route 11 between its junction with State Route 68 to the south and State Route 322 to the north.  Interstate 75 passes along the western boundary of Sweetwater.

Sweetwater is located in a valley amidst the foothills of the Great Smoky Mountains, and is surrounded by farmland.

Demographics

2020 census

As of the 2020 United States census, there were 6,312 people, 2,175 households, and 1,633 families residing in the city.

2000 census
As of the census of 2000, there were 5,586 people, 2,315 households, and 1,537 families residing in the city. The population density was 810.1 people per square mile (312.6/km2). There were 2,511 housing units at an average density of 364.2 per square mile (140.5/km2). The racial makeup of the city was 86.6% White, 7.32% African American, 0.14% Native American, 1.61% Asian, 0.02% Pacific Islander, 0.41% from other races, and 1.97% from two or more races. Hispanic or Latino of any race were 3.6% of the population.

There were 2,315 households, out of which 27.4% had children under the age of 18 living with them, 49.0% were married couples living together, 13.9% had a female householder with no husband present, and 33.6% were non-families. 30.5% of all households were made up of individuals, and 14.3% had someone living alone who was 65 years of age or older. The average household size was 2.32 and the average family size was 2.87.

In the city, the population was spread out, with 23.0% under the age of 18, 8.1% from 18 to 24, 25.1% from 25 to 44, 23.3% from 45 to 64, and 20.5% who were 65 years of age or older. The median age was 40 years. For every 100 females, there were 82.1 males. For every 100 females age 18 and over, there were 77.4 males.

The median income for a household in the city was $28,323, and the median income for a family was $35,269. Males had a median income of $29,982 versus $23,075 for females. The per capita income for the city was $16,746. About 11.5% of families and 16.4% of the population were below the poverty line, including 29.5% of those under age 18 and 18.1% of those age 65 or over.

Economy

, most of the economy consisted of agriculture business. In addition, some light industry is located in Sweetwater, including a chemical factory, a hosiery mill, and a stove plant.
A new Walmart Supercenter opened on September 11, 2013 and added 200 jobs to the Sweetwater area.
A Rural King store opened in Feb 2018.
On January 15, 2022, Red Stag Fulfillment announced plans to develop a 420-acre ecommerce distribution center along I-75, estimated to provide 3,500 jobs and annual tax revenue of $1.9 million to the city of Sweetwater.

Education

Sweetwater City Schools operates public elementary and middle schools in the portion of the city in Monroe County, with Monroe County Schools operating high school services. Sweetwater High School is part of the Monroe district.

The U.S. Census Bureau indicates the Sweetwater district is entirely in Monroe County, and that the small McMinn County portion of the city is in McMinn County Schools.

Tennessee Meiji Gakuin High School was located in Sweetwater from 1989 to 2007. It was located in the former Tennessee Military Institute.

Cross Creek K-12 operates as a private Christian school. It was developed by the couple Harold Jeffers Darragh, who also developed Willow Creek, and Karen Darragh.

Notable people
 Butch Baker, country music artist
 Gerald Brown, NFL and collegiate coach
 Kippy Brown, NFL and collegiate coach
 Harry T. Burn (1895-1977), Tennessee legislator who broke the deadlock on the 19th Amendment to the United States Constitution and gave women the right to vote in the United States, worked as an attorney in town from 1927 to 1951.
 North Callahan, historian and journalist
 Dwight Henry, politician
 Paul Dean Holt, former NASCAR Winston Cup driver
 Frank North, collegiate coach
 Gerald North, climatologist

See also

 List of cities in Tennessee

References

External links

 
 Tourism website
 Municipal Technical Advisory Service entry for Sweetwater — information on local government, elections, and link to charter

Cities in Monroe County, Tennessee
Cities in McMinn County, Tennessee
Cities in Tennessee